Borak may refer to:

 Borak, Bosnia and Herzegovina, a village near Kneževo, Bosnia and Herzegovina
 Borak, Croatia, a village near Omiš
 Borak, Iran (disambiguation)
 Laraki Borak, a Moroccan sportscar made by Laraki
 Borak rocket, an Iraqi 122mm nerve agent rocket 
 Borak (cosmetic), a facial cosmetic paste used by the Sama-Bajau people of Southeast Asia

See also
 El Borak, a fictional character created by Robert E. Howard
 Buraq, a creature in Islamic tradition
 Burak (name), a Turkish given name